The Customs Judge (German: Der Sittenrichter) is a 1929 German silent film directed by Carl Heinz Wolff and starring Margarete Schlegel, Gerd Briese and Margarete Kupfer.

The film's sets were designed by Gustav A. Knauer.

Cast
 Margarete Schlegel as Susi Böhm  
 Gerd Briese as Hans Herrmann  
 Margarete Kupfer as Frau Böhm  
 Rudolf Lettinger as Justizwachmeister Böhm  
 Erna Morena as Liddy Lohwald  
 Carl Auen as Hilmer  
 Leopold von Ledebur as Dr. Lohwald  
 Maria Forescu as Frau mit dem dunkeln Gewerbe  
 Julius Falkenstein as Kriminalkommissar  
 Ilse Nast as Eine Verurteilte 
 Kurt Brenkendorf as der Vater  
 Maria Kromer as die Mutter

References

Bibliography
 Alfred Krautz. International directory of cinematographers, set- and costume designers in film, Volume 4. Saur, 1984.

External links

1929 films
Films of the Weimar Republic
German silent feature films
Films directed by Carl Heinz Wolff
Films about abortion
German black-and-white films